Missing Pieces is a 2000 American made-for-television drama film starring James Coburn, Lisa Zane, Paul Kersey and William R. Moses.

Plot
A father travels to Mexico to claim the body of his son who has just committed suicide under mysterious circumstances.

Cast
James Coburn as Atticus Cody
Lisa Zane as Renata
Paul Kersey as Scott Cody
Finn Carter as Marilyn
William R. Moses as David
Julio Oscar Mechoso as Hernandez
Maxwell Caulfield as Stuart
Matthew Malone as Adam
Nathan Malone as Adam

References

External links

2000s English-language films
2000s American films
2000 television films
2000 drama films
2000 films
CBS network films
Films directed by Carl Schenkel
American drama television films